Aleph (or alef or alif, transliterated ʾ) is the first letter of the Semitic abjads, including Phoenician  , Hebrew  , Aramaic  , Syriac  , Arabic ʾ , and North Arabian 𐪑. It also appears as South Arabian 𐩱 and Ge'ez  .

These letters are believed to have derived from an Egyptian hieroglyph depicting an ox's head to describe the initial sound of  *ʾalp, the West Semitic word for ox (compare Biblical Hebrew  ʾelef, "ox"). The Phoenician variant gave rise to the Greek alpha, being re-interpreted to express not the glottal consonant but the accompanying vowel, and hence the Latin A and Cyrillic А.

Phonetically, aleph originally represented the onset of a vowel at the glottis. In Semitic languages, this functions as a prosthetic weak consonant, allowing roots with only two true consonants to be conjugated in the manner of a standard three consonant Semitic root. In most Hebrew dialects as well as Syriac, the aleph is an absence of a true consonant, a glottal stop. In Arabic, the alif represents the glottal stop pronunciation when it is the initial letter of a word. In texts with diacritical marks, the pronunciation of an aleph as a consonant is rarely indicated by a special marking, hamza in Arabic and mappiq in Tiberian Hebrew. In later Semitic languages, aleph could sometimes function as a mater lectionis indicating the presence of a vowel elsewhere (usually long). When this practice began is the subject of some controversy, though it had become well established by the late stage of Old Aramaic (ca. 200 BCE).

Origin
The name aleph is derived from the West Semitic word for "ox" (as in the Biblical Hebrew word Eleph (אֶלֶף) 'ox'), and the shape of the letter derives from a Proto-Sinaitic glyph that may have been based on an Egyptian hieroglyph, which depicts an ox's head. F1 

In Modern Standard Arabic, the word  /ʔaliːf/ literally means 'tamed' or 'familiar', derived from the root , from which the verb ألِف  means 'to be acquainted with; to be on intimate terms with'. In modern Hebrew, the same root  (alef-lamed-peh) gives me’ulaf, the passive participle of the verb le’alef, meaning 'trained' (when referring to pets) or 'tamed' (when referring to wild animals); the IDF rank of aluf, taken from an Edomite title of nobility, is also cognate.

Ancient Egyptian

The Egyptian "vulture" hieroglyph (Gardiner G1), by convention pronounced ) is also referred to as aleph, on grounds that it has traditionally been taken to represent a glottal stop, although some recent suggestions tend towards an alveolar approximant sound instead. Despite the name it does not correspond to an aleph in cognate Semitic words, where the single "reed" hieroglyph is found instead.

The phoneme is commonly transliterated by a symbol composed of two half-rings, in Unicode (as of version 5.1, in the Latin Extended-D range) encoded at U+A722 Ꜣ LATIN CAPITAL LETTER EGYPTOLOGICAL ALEF and U+A723 ꜣ LATIN SMALL LETTER EGYPTOLOGICAL ALEF. A fallback representation is the numeral 3, or the Middle English character ȝ Yogh; neither are to be preferred to the genuine Egyptological characters.

Aramaic

The Aramaic reflex of the letter is conventionally represented with the Hebrew  in typography for convenience, but the actual graphic form varied significantly over the long history and wide geographic extent of the language. Maraqten identifies three different aleph traditions in East Arabian coins: a lapidary Aramaic form that realizes it as a combination of a V-shape and a straight stroke attached to the apex, much like a Latin K; a cursive Aramaic form he calls the "elaborated X-form", essentially the same tradition as the Hebrew reflex; and an extremely cursive form of two crossed oblique lines, much like a simple Latin X.

Hebrew

Hebrew spelling: 

In Modern Israeli Hebrew, the letter either represents a glottal stop or indicates a hiatus (the separation of two adjacent vowels into distinct syllables, with no intervening consonant). It is sometimes silent (word-finally always, word-medially sometimes:   "he",   "main",   "head",   "first"). The pronunciation varies in different Jewish ethnic divisions.

In gematria, aleph represents the number 1, and when used at the beginning of Hebrew years, it means 1000 (e.g.  in numbers would be the Hebrew date 1754, not to be confused with 1754 CE).

Aleph, along with ayin, resh, he and heth, cannot receive a dagesh. (However, there are few very rare examples of the Masoretes adding a dagesh or mappiq to an aleph or resh. The verses of the Hebrew Bible for which an aleph with a mappiq or dagesh appears are Genesis 43:26, Leviticus 23:17, Job 33:21 and Ezra 8:18.)

In Modern Hebrew, the frequency of the usage of alef, out of all the letters, is 4.94%.

Aleph is sometimes used as a mater lectionis to denote a vowel, usually . That use is more common in words of Aramaic and Arabic origin, in foreign names, and some other borrowed words.

Rabbinic Judaism
Aleph is the subject of a midrash that praises its humility in not demanding to start the Bible. (In Hebrew, the Bible begins with the second letter of the alphabet, bet.) In the story, aleph is rewarded by being allowed to start the Ten Commandments.

In the Sefer Yetzirah, the letter aleph is king over breath, formed air in the universe, temperate in the year, and the chest in the soul.

Aleph is also the first letter of the Hebrew word emet, which means truth. In Jewish mythology, it was the letter aleph that was carved into the head of the golem that ultimately gave it life.

Aleph also begins the three words that make up God's mystical name in Exodus, I Am who I Am (in Hebrew, Ehyeh Asher Ehyeh ), and aleph is an important part of mystical amulets and formulas.

Aleph, in Jewish mysticism, represents the oneness of God. The letter can be seen as being composed of an upper yud, a lower yud, and a vav leaning on a diagonal. The upper yud represents the hidden and ineffable aspects of God while the lower yud represents God's revelation and presence in the world. The vav ("hook") connects the two realms.

Jewish mysticism relates aleph to the element of air, and the Scintillating Intelligence (#11) of the path between Kether and Chokmah in the Tree of the Sephiroth .

Yiddish

In Yiddish, aleph is used for several orthographic purposes in native words, usually with different diacritical marks borrowed from Hebrew niqqud:
 With no diacritics, aleph is silent; it is written at the beginning of words before vowels spelled with the letter vov or yud. For instance, oykh 'also' is spelled אויך. The digraph וי represents the initial diphthong [], but that digraph is not permitted at the beginning of a word in Yiddish orthography, so it is preceded by a silent aleph. Some publications use a silent aleph adjacent to such vowels in the middle of a word as well when necessary to avoid ambiguity.
 An aleph with the diacritic pasekh, אַ, represents the vowel  in standard Yiddish.
 An aleph with the diacritic komets, אָ, represents the vowel  in standard Yiddish.
Loanwords from Hebrew or Aramaic in Yiddish are spelled as they are in their language of origin.

Syriac Alaph/Olaf

It is used in word-initial position to mark a word beginning with a vowel, but some words beginning with i or u do not need its help, and sometimes, an initial alap/olaph is elided. For example, when the Syriac first-person singular pronoun  is in enclitic positions, it is pronounced no/na (again west/east), rather than the full form eno/ana. The letter occurs very regularly at the end of words, where it represents the long final vowels o/a or e. In the middle of the word, the letter represents either a glottal stop between vowels (but West Syriac pronunciation often makes it a palatal approximant), a long i/e (less commonly o/a) or is silent.

South Arabian/Ge'ez 
In the Ancient South Arabian alphabet, 𐩱 appears as the seventeenth letter of the South Arabian abjad. The letter is used to render a glottal stop .

In the Ge'ez alphabet, ʾälef አ appears as the thirteenth letter of its abjad. This letter is also used to render a glottal stop .

Arabic
Together with Hebrew aleph, Greek alpha and Latin A, it is descended from Phoenician , from a reconstructed Proto-Canaanite  "ox".

Alif is written in one of the following ways depending on its position in the word:

Arabic variants

Alif with hamza:  and 

The Arabic letter was used to render either a long  or a glottal stop . That led to orthographical confusion and to the introduction of the additional letter  .

The choice of carrier depends on complicated orthographic rules. It is the only possible carrier if hamza is the first phoneme of a word. Where alif acts as a carrier for hamza, hamza is added above the alif, or, for initial alif-, below it and indicates that the letter so modified is indeed a glottal stop, not a long vowel.

A second type of hamza,  whose diacritic is normally omitted outside of sacred texts, occurs only as the initial letter of the definite article and in some related cases. Alif is always the carrier.

Alif maddah: 

The  is a double alif, expressing both a glottal stop and a long vowel. Essentially, it is the same as a  sequence:  (final )  , for example in    'last'. 

"It has become standard for a hamza followed by a long ā to be written as two alifs, one vertical and one horizontal." (the "horizontal" alif being the maddah sign).

Alif maqṣūrah: 

Although it looks different from a regular alif, it represents the same sound , often realized as a short vowel. When it is written,  is indistinguishable from final Persian ye or Arabic  as it is written in Egypt, Sudan and sometimes elsewhere.

In Arabic, alif maqsurah  is not used initially or medially, and it is not joinable initially or medially in any font. However, the letter is used initially and medially in the Uyghur Arabic alphabet and the Arabic-based Kyrgyz alphabet, representing the vowel /ɯ/:.

Numeral
As a numeral, alif stands for the number one. It may be modified as follows to represent other numbers.

Other uses

Mathematics
In set theory, the Hebrew aleph glyph is used as the symbol to denote the aleph numbers, which represent the cardinality of infinite sets. This notation was introduced by mathematician Georg Cantor. In older mathematics books, the letter aleph is often printed upside down by accident, partly because a Monotype matrix for aleph was mistakenly constructed the wrong way up.

Character encodings

See also

 ʾ
 Al-
 Aleph number
 Arabic yāʼ
 "The Aleph", a short story by Jorge Luis Borges describing a point in space that contains all other spaces at once
 Hamzah
 Aleph (novel)
 Aleph null

References

Phoenician alphabet
Alef
Hebrew letters
Vowel letters